Willie Anderson (born 17 September 1967 in Kirkcaldy, Scotland) is a former Scotland A international rugby union player for Glasgow Warriors, who played at the Tighthead Prop position.

Starting playing at amateur club Kirkcaldy RFC, when professionalism was introduced in Scotland, Anderson joined the Caledonia Reds side. No fewer than 9 Kirkcaldy players played in the Caledonia Reds team in the Heineken Cup of this era The Caledonia Reds won the first Scottish Inter-District Championship in the Scottish professional era in 1996–97 season.

Unfortunately the SRU could not afford four district teams at this time. They disbanded Caledonia Reds and merged the district into that of the Glasgow Warriors, which was known then as Glasgow Caledonians. Anderson was one of the lucky players that was taken on by the Glasgow side in 1998.

Internationally, he had 11 eleven appearances at Scotland 'A' and a test appearance against Spain in Rugby World Cup qualification. Jim Telfer said of Anderson's call up for the Spain match: "Willie has been performing very well for Glasgow Caledonians this season and we want to give him a shot at this level to see how he does. Hopefully, this will be a stern test."

There have been calls for these test appearances - including in the Spain match - to be designated as a full Scotland cap by the SRU; Anderson is one of 30 players who could be retrospectively given a full Scotland cap if the Scottish Rugby Union follows the Scottish Football Association's example and belatedly honours their players. Anderson said this of his wish for a full Scotland cap: "I have been following and playing rugby since I was a small schoolkid, and it would be my ultimate ambition to get a Scotland cap."

Anderson went on to play with Glasgow to 2001; he struggled with injury in 2000 with a detached bicep muscle and mutually agreed to a release in his contract in January 2001. However he was later included in the Scotland A squad of March 2001.

Anderson is now the under-18 coach at Kirkcaldy RFC.

References

External links 

1967 births
Living people
Caledonia Reds players
Glasgow Warriors players
Kirkcaldy RFC players
North and Midlands players
Rugby union players from Kirkcaldy
Scotland 'A' international rugby union players
Scottish rugby union players
Rugby union props